3-Benzhydrylmorpholine is a drug that was developed by American Home Products in the 1950s. It has stimulant and anorectic effects and is related to both pipradrol and phenmetrazine.

See also
 Desoxypipradrol
 β-Phenylmethamphetamine

References

Stimulants
Morpholines
Benzhydryl compounds